Alex Gerhard "Lex" Mullink (born 19 December 1944) is a retired Dutch rower who won a bronze medal in the coxed fours at the 1964 Summer Olympics.

References

1944 births
Living people
Dutch male rowers
Olympic rowers of the Netherlands
Rowers at the 1964 Summer Olympics
Olympic bronze medalists for the Netherlands
Sportspeople from Almelo
Olympic medalists in rowing
Medalists at the 1964 Summer Olympics
21st-century Dutch people
20th-century Dutch people